Epipactis purpurata, the violet helleborine, is an orchid found in France, the United Kingdom, Slovenia, and Serbia.

References

External links 
 inpn.mnhn.fr (French)

Orchids of Europe
purpurata